Oakwood Bank is bank headquartered in Dallas, Texas. The bank has 2 branches: one in Oakwood, Texas and one in Dallas, Texas. The bank is a subsidiary of Oakwood Bancshares, Inc., a bank holding company.

History
The bank was founded in 1900 under the name Oakwood State Bank.

In 1958, Roddy Rawls Wiley, Jr. took over the bank after his father died.

In 2005, the bank received a "substantial noncompliance" rating for lack of compliance with the Community Reinvestment Act.

In 2009, the bank was referred to as "America's Smallest Bank" as it had only $3 million in total assets and $2.13 million in total deposits.

For most of its existence, in addition to Wiley, the bank had only 2 other employees, 76-year-old Lela Coates and 71-year-old Neta Eldridge. It had no automated teller machines.

After the death of Wiley in 2010, the bank was acquired by Dorothy Cadenhead.

In April 2017, the bank raised $38 million in capital by selling a controlling stake to new management, allowing the bank to open a branch in Dallas, Texas. The bank also changed its name from "Oakwood State Bank" to "Oakwood Bank".

References

Banks based in Texas
Banks established in 1900
1900 establishments in Texas